Members of the New South Wales Legislative Assembly who served in the 31st  parliament held their seats from 1935 to 1938. They were elected at the 1935 state election, and at by-elections. The Speaker was Sir Daniel Levy until his death in 1937 and then Reginald Weaver.

See also
Second Stevens ministry
Results of the 1935 New South Wales state election
Candidates of the 1935 New South Wales state election

References

Members of New South Wales parliaments by term
20th-century Australian politicians